The 1945 NYU Violets football team was an American football team that represented New York University as an independent during the 1945 college football season. 

In their second season under head coach John J. Weinheimer, the Violets compiled a 3–4 record and were outscored 125–89.

The team played its home games at Ohio Field on NYU's University Heights campus in The Bronx borough of New York City.

Schedule

References

NYU
NYU Violets football seasons
NYU Violets football
University Heights, Bronx
Sports in the Bronx